Shio may refer to:

People with the given name
Shio Aragvispireli (1867–1926), Georgian writer 
Shio Batmanishvili (1885–1937), Georgian Greek Catholic priest
Shio Satō (1952–2010), Japanese manga artist
Shio Fujii (born 1985), Japanese handball player
Shio Fukuda (born 2004), Japanese footballer
Shio II of Georgia, 15th-century Georgian prelate
Shio Mujiri (born 1969), Georgian Orthodox hierarch

Places
Shio, Ishikawa, a town located in Hakui District, Japan
Shio-Mgvime monastery, a medieval monastic complex in Georgia

Other uses
Shio, Koshō, a 2009 album by Greeeen
Shio, Chinese zodiac in Hokkien language
Shio no Michi, a road in ancient Japan

Japanese feminine given names